Stanley O. Ikenberry (born March 3, 1935) is an American academic who served as the fourteenth president of the University of Illinois. Ikenberry was responsible for a major consolidate of University campuses and new student initiatives.

As an undergraduate, Ikenberry attended Shepard College, where his father served as the president. He received his M.A.(1957) and Ph.D (1960) degrees from Michigan State University. Ikenberry started his career at Michigan State before serving as dean of the College of Human Resources and Education at West Virginia University and senior vice president at Pennsylvania State University. 

In 1979, at age 44, Ikenberry became the youngest president of the University of Illinois. He remained in this role for 16 years and is the longest serving president in the University's history.  In this role, Ikenberry led the consolidation of the University's Medical Center and Chicago Circle campuses to form the current University of Illinois at Chicago, now the largest and most comprehensive research university campus in metropolitan Chicago. 

In Urbana-Champaign, Ikenberry led several major academic initiatives, including the creation of the Beckman Institute for Advanced Science and Technology and the National Center for Supercomputing Applications. Ikenberry led the University's first major capital campaign and launched a second campaign in the late 1980s to raise in excess a billion dollars. The quality and diversity of the Illinois student body increased significantly during his tenure with his creation of the President's Scholars Program. 

Ikenberry retired from the University presidency in 1995, but returned in 2010 to serve as Interim President.

Ikenberry also served as the 10th President of the American Council on Education. Currently, Ikenberry serves as President Emeritus for the University, Regent Professor in the College of Education and Principal Investigator of the National Institute for Learning Outcomes Assessment (NILOA). In 2008, Ikenberry partnered with George Kuh to create the National Institute for Learning Outcomes Assessment (NILOA). This Institute was established to monitor and assist institutions as they develop evidence for student learning.

In 2008, the University of Illinois opened the Stanley O. Ikenberry Commons and the Ikenberry Dining.

References

1935 births
Living people
Leaders of the University of Illinois
Michigan State University alumni
Pennsylvania State University faculty
Shepherd University alumni
West Virginia University faculty